P. M. Sayeed Calicut University Centre, Andrott, is a degree college located in Andrott, Lakshadweep. It was established in 2005. This is one of the center of Calicut University for fulfilling the education demand of Lakshadweep people. This college offers undergraduate and postgraduate courses in arts, commerce and science.

Departments

Aquaculture (B.Sc. & M.Sc.)
Commerce (B.Com. & M.Com.)

References

External links

Universities and colleges in Lakshadweep
Colleges affiliated with the University of Calicut
Educational institutions established in 2005